Lawrence James Tierney (March 15, 1919 – February 26, 2002) was an American film and television actor who is best known for his many screen portrayals of mobsters and tough guys in a career that spanned over 50 years. His roles mirrored his own frequent brushes with the law. In 2005, film critic David Kehr of The New York Times described "the hulking Tierney" as "not so much an actor as a frightening force of nature".

Early life
Lawrence James Tierney was born in Brooklyn, New York on March 15, 1919, the son of Mary Alice (née Crowley) (1895–1960) and Lawrence Hugh Tierney (1891–1964). His father was an Irish-American policeman with the New York aqueduct police force. Tierney was a star athlete at Boys' High School, winning awards for track and field and joining Omega Gamma Delta fraternity.

After graduating from high school, he earned an athletic scholarship to Manhattan College but quit after two years to work temporarily as a laborer constructing a section of the 85-mile-long Delaware Aqueduct, which supplies nearly half of New York City's water supply. He then bounced around the country from job to job, working for a time as a catalogue model for Sears Roebuck & Company.

Career
After an acting coach suggested he try the stage, Tierney joined the Black Friars theatre group, moving on to the American-Irish Theatre. He was spotted there in 1943 by an RKO talent scout and given a film contract to work in Hollywood, California. In 1943 and 1944, Tierney was cast in several uncredited roles in RKO releases such as Gildersleeve on Broadway, Government Girl, The Ghost Ship for producer Val Lewton, The Falcon Out West, Seven Days Ashore, and Youth Runs Wild, also for Lewton.

Dillinger and stardom
Tierney's breakthrough role was starring as 1930s bank robber John Dillinger in 1945's Dillinger, made for the King Brothers and Monogram Pictures, which borrowed him from RKO. Advertised as a tale "written in bullets, blood, and blondes", Dillinger was initially banned from theaters in Chicago and other cities where the gangster had operated. A low-budget production that cost $60,000 to make, Dillinger nevertheless proved popular, with Tierney being characterized as "memorably menacing".

Back at RKO, Tierney resumed his work there in small and supporting roles in Those Endearing Young Charms (1945), Back to Bataan (1945) (with John Wayne in one scene), Mama Loves Papa (1946), and in the Western Badman's Territory (1946) in which he portrays Jesse James. However, as ticket sales for Dillinger continued to rise and that film's financial success became apparent at RKO, the studio promoted Tierney in 1946 to star status in Step by Step, another film noir, one that portrays an ex-Marine being falsely accused of murder. He next starred as a reformed prison inmate in the 1946 release San Quentin.

The next year he was cast as the lead in two more RKO productions that have since gained cult followings among film noir enthusiasts: The Devil Thumbs a Ride directed by Felix E. Feist and the more notorious Born to Kill directed by Robert Wise. In Feist's film, Tierney plays a homicidal hitch-hiker, while under Wise's direction he portrays a suave but murderous conman. Film critic Bosley Crowther of The New York Times condemned Born to Kill upon its release in 1947, professing that it was "not only morally disgusting but an offense to a normal intellect." He decried Tierney "as the bold, bad killer whose ambition is to 'fix it so's I can spit in anybody's eye,'" being "given outrageous license to demonstrate the histrionics of nastiness." Despite such negative contemporary reviews of the film, more recent critics and film historians have expressed admiration for Tierney's intense performance and identified the production as a quintessential example of film noir, in particular of RKO's approach to the genre. 

Yet, in reflecting on his career, Tierney himself maintained he did not like playing such violent roles:

Following Born to Kill, Tierney was periodically cast in more sympathetic roles. In RKO's 1948 release Bodyguard, based on a story co-written by Robert Altman and George W. George, he plays a man wrongly accused of murder. That year RKO also announced its intentions to star him in The Clay Pigeon, but Bill Williams was instead assigned the leading role.

Post-RKO
In 1950, Tierney was cast by Eagle-Lion Films to star in Kill or Be Killed, directed by Max Nosseck, who had also directed Dillinger. That same year, however, Tierney only received second billing in Joseph Pevney's Shakedown, although in 1951 he returned to a starring role in another film produced by Eagle Lion and directed by Nosseck: The Hoodlum. He then returned to RKO to play a supporting role, performing again as Jesse James in Best of the Badmen (1951). After co-starring in The Bushwhackers (1952), director Cecil B. DeMille cast him as the villain who causes a train wreck in the 1952 Best Picture Oscar-winner The Greatest Show on Earth. Tierney's supporting work in that film earned him a request by the director of Paramount Pictures to put him under contract, but that proposal was dropped by the studio when the actor was arrested for fighting in a bar.

Additional supporting roles and return to the stage
For the remainder of the 1950s, Tierney continued to work in supporting roles in The Man Behind the Badge, The Steel Cage (1954), and Singing in the Dark (1956). He did share top billing with Kathleen Crowley, John Carradine, and Jayne Mansfield in the low-budget film noir Female Jungle (1956), but as offers of further screen work steadily declined, he returned to the stage, playing Duke Mantee in a touring version of The Petrified Forest alongside Franchot Tone and Betsy von Furstenberg.

Television
During the 1950s and 1960s, Tierney also had guest roles in many television series, including Naked City, The Detectives, New York Confidential, Man with a Camera, Adventures in Paradise, Peter Gunn, The Barbara Stanwyck Show, Follow the Sun, Bus Stop, The Lloyd Bridges Show, and The Alfred Hitchcock Hour.
Among his film roles were parts in John Cassavetes' A Child Is Waiting (1963), Naked Evil (1966), Custer of the West (1967), and Killer Without a Face (1968). After Child is Waiting he moved to France. After several years of living in France, Tierney returned to New York City, but his troubles with the law continued. In New York City, he worked as a bartender and construction worker, and drove a horse-drawn carriage in Central Park.

1970–1982
According to the book The Films of John Avildsen: Rocky, The Karate Kid and Other Underdogs, Tierney was supposed to play the role of Joe Curran in Avildsen's 1970 hit Joe. However, he was fired due to an incident two days before principal photography began when he was arrested for assaulting a bartender who refused to serve him any more hard liquor.

During the 1970s, he occasionally found film work, appearing in a bit part as a security guard in Otto Preminger's Such Good Friends (1971), as an FBI agent in Joseph Zito's Abduction (1975), in Andy Warhol's Bad, in 1976 (which he later described as "a terrible experience—unprofessional"), as well as small roles in Cassavetes' Gloria (1980) and Zito's The Prowler (1981). He was also in The Kirlian Witness (1980), Bloodrage (1980), and Arthur (1981). He was second billed in the independently produced horror film Midnight (1982).

Return to Hollywood
Tierney returned to Hollywood in December 1983, and over the next 16 years, resumed a fairly successful acting career in film and television. He guest-starred on several television shows such as Remington Steele, Fame, Hunter, Hill Street Blues, L.A. Law, Star Trek: The Next Generation, Star Trek: Deep Space Nine, and The Simpsons, where former show runner Josh Weinstein called Tierney's appearance "the craziest guest star experience we ever had".

In 1984, Tierney appeared as part of a national campaign in an Excedrin TV commercial playing a construction worker. In 1985, he had a small speaking role as the chief of the New York City police in John Huston's Prizzi's Honor. Between 1985 to 1987, Tierney made several guest appearances on the last two seasons of the police drama Hill Street Blues, portraying Desk Sergeant Jenkins working the precinct's night shifts. He spoke the last line of dialogue on the series' final episode when he answered the front desk phone, uttering "Hill Street."

Tierney had a more substantial supporting role as the father of protagonist Ryan O'Neal in Norman Mailer's film adaptation of his own novel Tough Guys Don't Dance (1987). He also played a baseball-bat wielding bar owner in the film adaptation of Stephen King's Silver Bullet. Tierney credited Tough Guys Don't Dance in particular with rejuvenating his acting career, and he personally ranked it as some of his best work. In 1988, Tierney played Cyrus Redblock, a tough holodeck gangster in the Star Trek: The Next Generation episode "The Big Goodbye". In February 1991, he guest-starred as Elaine Benes's gruff father Alton Benes in the Seinfeld episode "The Jacket".

Reservoir Dogs and later career
In 1991, Quentin Tarantino cast him in a supporting role as crime lord Joe Cabot in Reservoir Dogs. The success of the film bookended Tierney's career in playing gangsters. In an homage to his first starring role, Tierney reports that one of his henchmen was "dead as Dillinger". During production, Tierney's off-screen antics both amused and disturbed the cast and crew. At the end of his first week of directing Reservoir Dogs, Tarantino got into a fist fight with Tierney and fired him. He later referred to Tierney as "a complete lunatic" who "just needed to be sedated".

Despite his reputation as a brawler and being difficult to work with, Tierney remained in steady demand as a character actor in Hollywood until he suffered a mild stroke in 1995 which made him gradually slow his career. He had suffered a previous stroke in 1982. He turned to doing voice-over work on animated features and made occasional appearances in film and television (most of which feature him only sitting) as his health slowly deteriorated until his death. One of Tierney's later roles was an uncredited cameo appearance as Bruce Willis' invalid father in Armageddon (1998) in a short scene which ended up being deleted from the theatrical version. The same year, his long-time agent, Don Gerler, recounted Tierney's continuing troubles with the law: "A few years back [in 1994] I was still bailing him out of jail. He was 75-years-old and still the toughest guy in the bar!" His final acting role was a small part in the 1999 independent film Evicted, written and directed by his nephew Michael Tierney, after which Lawrence Tierney, then age 80, retired from acting altogether.

Off-screen troubles
Tierney's numerous arrests for being drunk and disorderly and jail terms for assault on civilians and lawmen alike took a toll on his career. He was an admitted alcoholic who tried to go sober in 1982 after having a mild stroke, once observing during a 1987 interview that he "threw away about seven careers through drink".

Between 1944 and 1951, Tierney was arrested over 12 times in Los Angeles for brawling, frequently for drunkenness which included ripping a public telephone off a wall in a bar, hitting a waiter in the face with a sugar bowl for refusing to serve him any more drinks, and attempting to choke a taxi driver.  He was jailed for three months for brawling in May 1947 and again in June 1949 and drunkenness in January 1949 and October 1950. His legal troubles included a 90-day jail sentence which he served from August to October 1951 for breaking a New York college student's jaw during another barroom brawl. He served 66 days in the city jail in Chicago, Illinois from March to May 1952 for drunk and disorderly charges. In October 1951, he was sent to a mental hospital in Chicago after being found disheveled in a church. In New York City, he was arrested for assault and battery of a barroom pianist in August 1953 and again in October 1958 for resisting arrest and assaulting two police officers in another barroom brawl. At the time of his October 1958 arrest outside a Manhattan bar, The New York Times reported that he had been arrested six times in California and five in New York City on similar charges.

In January 1973, he was stabbed in a bar fight on the West Side of Manhattan. Two years later, Tierney was questioned by New York City police in connection with the apparent suicide of a 24-year-old woman who had jumped from the window of her high-rise apartment. Tierney told police "I had just gotten there, and she just went out the window." He never was arrested or charged with the young woman's death. The apparent suicide closely resembles the death of Rosa, played by Allene Roberts in the 1951 film The Hoodlum. Tierney’s Vincent Lubeck, the hoodlum of the title, is suspected of driving Rosa into throwing herself off a roof shortly after talking to Lubeck.

In July 1991, during the filming of Reservoir Dogs, Tierney shot at his nephew in a drunken rage at his Hollywood apartment, and was arrested and jailed. He was released for a day from the jail to continue filming, as recounted by the film's director Quentin Tarantino in an interview. As a result, Tarantino never again worked with or hired Tierney to act in his films.

Personal life and death
With much of his career and personal life repeatedly embroiled in legal problems and hampered by chronic alcoholism, Tierney elected to never marry despite having several short-term relationships with a number of women in the 1940s, '50s and '60s. He did, however, father a daughter named Elizabeth who was born in 1961.

Both of Tierney's younger brothers preceded him in death, Edward dying in 1983 and Gerard (actor Scott Brady) in 1985. On February 26, 2002, at age 82, Lawrence Tierney died in his sleep of pneumonia in a Los Angeles nursing home, where he had been residing for nearly two years.

Biography
The first biography of the actor, Lawrence Tierney: Hollywood's Real-Life Tough Guy, was written by Burt Kearns and published on December 6, 2022, by the University Press of Kentucky.

Selected filmography

 Gildersleeve on Broadway (1943) as Cab Driver (uncredited)
 Government Girl (1943) as FBI Man (uncredited)
 The Ghost Ship (1943) as Seaman Louie Parker (uncredited)
 The Falcon Out West (1944) as Orchestra Leader (uncredited)
 Seven Days Ashore (1944) as Crewman (uncredited)
 Youth Runs Wild (1944) as Larry Duncan
 Dillinger (1945) as John Dillinger
 Those Endearing Young Charms (1945) as Lt. Ted Brewster
 Back to Bataan (1945) as Lt. Cmdr. Waite
 Mama Loves Papa (1945) as Sharpe
 Sing Your Way Home (1945) as Reporter in Paris (uncredited)
 Badman's Territory (1946) as Jesse James
 Step By Step (1946) as Johnny Christopher
 San Quentin (1946) as Jim Roland
 The Devil Thumbs a Ride (1947) as Steve Morgan
 Born to Kill (1947) as Sam
 Bodyguard (1948) as Mike Carter
 Kill or Be Killed (1950) as Robert Warren
 Shakedown (1950) as Harry Colton
 The Hoodlum (1951) as Vincent Lubeck
 Best of the Badmen (1951) as Jesse James
 The Bushwackers (1951) as Sam Tobin
 The Greatest Show on Earth (1952) as Mr. Henderson
 The Steel Cage (1954) as Chet Harmon, a Ringleader (segment "The Hostages")
 Female Jungle (1956) as Det. Sgt. Jack Stevens
 Singing in the Dark (1956) as Biff Lamont
 A Child Is Waiting (1963) as Douglas Benham
 Naked Evil (1966) as The Doctor (U.S. version)
 Custer of the West (1967) as Gen. Philip Sheridan
 Killer Without a Face (1968)
 Such Good Friends (1971) as Hospital Guard
 Abduction (1975) as FBI Agent I
 Andy Warhol's Bad (1977) as O'Reilly-O'Crapface
 The Kirlian Witness (1979) as Detective
 Bloodrage (1980) as Malone
 Gloria (1980) as Broadway Bartender
 Arthur (1981) as Man in Coffee Shop
 The Prowler (1981) as Maj. Chatham
 Midnight (1982) as Bert Johnson
 Terrible Joe Moran (1984) as Pico
 Nothing Lasts Forever (1984) as Carriage Driver
 Prizzi's Honor (1985) as Lt. Hanley
 Silver Bullet (1985) as Owen Knopfler
 Murphy's Law (1986) as Cameron
 From a Whisper to a Scream (1987) as Warden
 Tough Guys Don't Dance (1987) as Dougy Madden
 The Naked Gun: From the Files of Police Squad! (1988) as Angel Manager
 House III: The Horror Show (1989) as Warden
 Why Me? (1990) as Armenian Robber #1
 Dillinger (1991) as Sheriff Sarber
 Wizards of the Demon Sword (1991) as Slave Master
 The Runestone (1991) as Chief Richardson
 City of Hope (1991) as Kerrigan
 The Death Merchant (1991) as Ivan Yates
 Reservoir Dogs (1992) as Joe Cabot
 Eddie Presley (1992) as Joe West
 Red (1993 short) as Louis "Red" Deutsch
 Junior (1994) as Mover
 Starstruck (1995) as Patron
 Fatal Passion (1995) as Robert Pearlman
 2 Days in the Valley (1996) as Older Man
 American Hero (1997) as Captain Roads
 Southie (1998) as Colie Powers
 Armageddon (1998) as Eddie "Gramp" Stamper (uncredited)
 Evicted (1999) as Bob (filmed in 1996; final role)

See also 
 Lawrence Tierney: Hollywood's Real-Life Tough Guy

References

External links

 Website for biography, Lawrence Tierney: Hollywood's Real-Life Tough Guy
 Lawrence Tierney Official Website
 
 Todd Mecklem's Tierney tribute
 Essay on Tierney by writer Eddie Muller

1919 births
2002 deaths
Male actors from New York City
American male film actors
American male television actors
American male stage actors
RKO Pictures contract players
American people of Irish descent
People from Brooklyn
Deaths from pneumonia in California
20th-century American male actors
Boys High School (Brooklyn) alumni